Safin Futsal Club Pati is an Indonesian professional futsal club based in Pati, Central Java. The club plays in the Indonesia Pro Futsal League.

Players

Current squad

Sponsor

Club Honours

National competitions
Pro Futsal League
Runner-up: 2018, 2020
Third place: 2019

Continental competitions
AFF Futsal Club Championship
Semi-finalist: 2018

Coaching staff

References 

Futsal clubs in Indonesia
Pati Regency
Futsal clubs established in 2017
2017 establishments in Indonesia